David Laporte (ca. 1787 – ca. 1857) was Mayor of Ponce, Puerto Rico, from 1 January 1847 – 30 June 1847.

References

See also

List of mayors of Ponce, Puerto Rico
List of Puerto Ricans

Mayors of Ponce, Puerto Rico
1780s births
1850s deaths
Year of birth uncertain
Year of death uncertain